Things That Hang from Trees is a 2006 drama film directed by Ido Mizrahy and written by Aaron Louis Tordini.  It is based on the novella of the same name by Tordini (under the pen name T. A. Louis).

Plot
Florida, 1969. 8-year-old Tommy Wheeler is incorrectly seen as mentally-impaired by many of the local townspeople. Tommy lives alone with his skanky mother, Connie Mae, a sex shop owner. This emotionally troubled child also struggles with painful memories of his abusive, estranged father, Tom, whose mistreatment he recreates in a self-flagellating manner by systematically subjecting himself to the sadism of the 12-year-old local bully, Bear Hadley. While the town barber, George Burgess, a psychotically religious zealot, obsesses over Connie Mae, Tommy fantasizes about watching the town fireworks from atop the local lighthouse. The boy finally realizes this dream, but when he descends, he happens upon a shocking discovery that changes his world forever by bringing a permanent end to his childhood innocence.

Cast

Distributor
Radio London Films

Awards
2006: Best Film, American Independents, Troia International Film Festival
2008: Best Film, Corto Imola International Film
2008: Award of Excellence, Accolade Competition

External links
Official site

2006 films
2006 drama films
American drama films
Films shot in Jacksonville, Florida
Films set in 1969
Films set in the 1960s
Films set in Florida
2000s English-language films
2000s American films